Lala Mustafa Pasha ( – 7 August 1580), also known by the additional epithet Kara, was an Ottoman Bosnian general and Grand Vizier from the Sanjak of Bosnia.

Life
He was born around 1500, near the Glasinac in Sokolac Plateau in Bosnia to a Christian Sokolović family, the younger brother of Deli Husrev Pasha, who apparently helped him rise through the system's ranks more quickly.

Mustafa Pasha briefly served as kaymakam (acting governor) of Egypt Eyalet in 1549. He had risen to the position of Beylerbeyi of Damascus and then to that of Fifth Vizier.

The honorific "Lala" means "tutor to the Sultan"; he was tutor to Sultan Suleiman the Magnificent's sons, including Şehzade Bayezid. He also had a long-standing feud with his cousin, Sokollu Mehmed Pasha.

He commanded the Ottoman land forces during the conquest of previously Venetian Cyprus in 1570/71, and in the campaign against Georgia and Persia in 1578. During the campaign on Cyprus, Lala Mustafa Pasha, who was known for his cruelty towards vanquished opponents, ordered the Venetian commander of Famagusta, Marco Antonio Bragadin, flayed alive and other Venetian military officers killed in sight or executed, even though he had promised safe passage upon surrendering the city to the Turkish army. It also meant that Mustafa had indicated his aggressive intentions to the Sultan's court.

He was a Damat ("bridegroom") to the Imperial family through his marriage to Hümaşah Sultan, the only daughter of Şehzade Mehmed, son of Suleiman the Magnificent and his wife Hurrem Sultan. The two together had a son named Sultanzade Abdülbaki Bey.

In the final three months of his life, he was Grand Vizier from 28 April 1580 until his death. He is buried in the courtyard of the Eyüp Sultan Mosque in Istanbul. His tomb was designed by Ottoman architect Mimar Sinan.

Death
Lala Mustafa Pasha died in 1580 in Constantinople due to his old age or a heart attack, his tomb is located in Eyup Sultan. He was succeeded by the famous Albanian Koca Sinan Pasha.

Issue
Lala Mustafa Pasha was the second husband of Hümaşah Sultan, Ottoman princess, daughter of Şehzade Mehmed and granddaughter of Sultan Süleyman I and Hürrem Sultan. They married on 25 August 1575. By her, he had a son:
Sultanzade Abdülbaki Bey. He married Safiye Hanımsultan, daughter of his mother's cousin Ismihan Sultan (daughter of Sultan Selim II and Nurbanu Sultan)

Legacy
He has a street named after him in cities including Larnaca, Cyprus. His invasion and brutal treatment of the Venetian leaders in Cyprus led to Pope Pius V promoting a Roman Catholic coalition against the Ottomans which turned into the Battle of Lepanto in 1571.

See also
 Lala Mustafa Pasha's Caucasian campaign
 Ferhad Pasha Sokolović
 List of Ottoman governors of Egypt
 Ottoman Bosnia and Herzegovina

References

Sources
Bicheno, Hugh. Crescent and Cross: the Battle of Lepanto 1571. Phoenix, London, 2003. .

Currey, E. Hamilton, Sea-Wolves of the Mediterranean,, London, 1910
Foglietta, U. The sieges of Nicosia and Famagusta. London: Waterlow, 1903.

1500s births
Year of birth uncertain
1580 deaths
16th-century Ottoman military personnel
16th-century Grand Viziers of the Ottoman Empire
16th-century Ottoman governors of Egypt
Pashas
Military personnel of the Ottoman Empire
Ottoman governors of Damascus
Ottoman governors of Egypt
Ottoman people of the Ottoman–Persian Wars
People from the Ottoman Empire of Bosnian descent
Bosnian Muslims from the Ottoman Empire
Devshirme
Lalas (title)
Ottoman governors of Cyprus